The National Committee of the Chinese Agricultural, Forestry and Water Conservancy Workers’ Union is a national industrial union of the All-China Federation of Trade Unions in the People's Republic of China.

It is led by the Chinese Communist Party and lacks independence. According to Charter of China Trade Union, which is passed by the 17th National Congress of China Trade Unions on October 26, 2018, “The China Trade Union is a mass organization of the working class led by the Communist Party of China and a voluntary union of employees. It is a bridge and link between the Communist Party of China and the masses of workers, an important social pillar of the state power, and a representative of the interests of its members and workers.” “ The China trade unions persist in consciously accepting the leadership of the Communist Party of China, shoulder the political responsibility of uniting and guiding the workers and the masses to listen to and follow the Communist Party of China, and consolidate and expand the class basis and mass basis of the Communist Party of China’s governance.”

References

External links
basic info from the ACFTU

National industrial unions (China)
Agriculture and forestry trade unions
Agricultural organizations based in China